Evelyn Buquid Fuentebella (born September 15, 1945) widely known as Nanay Belen, is the Municipal Mayor of Sagñay in the province of  Camarines Sur, Philippines, serving from 2010 until 2019. She is the wife of former Speaker of the Philippine House of Representatives Arnulfo Fuentebella.

Early life and education 
Evelyn Buquid was born on September 15, 1945, in Sagñay to former Camarines Sur Provincial Board Member and COMELEC Regional Chairman Atty. William Buquid.

Career
Before she entered politics, Fuentebella worked as an executive assistant to then Prime Minister of the Philippines and Minister of Finance Cesar E. A. Virata.

In 2010, she ran as Municipal Mayor of Sagñay winning by a large margin of votes.

In 2015, a complaint for misappropriation of public funds was lodged against Fuentebella and her husband before the Ombudsman.

On May 12, 2016, Fuentebella won her third term as mayor of Sagnay by a landslide.

Personal life
Fuentebella is married to former Speaker of the Philippine House of Representatives Arnulfo P. Fuentebella and they have four sons and two daughters, two of whom are also in politics: Tigaon Municipal Mayor Arnulf Bryan B. Fuentebella. and Camarines Sur's 4th District Representative Felix William B. Fuentebella.

References

External links
 Building Institutions: The Fuentebella Legacy by Coylee Gamboa
 http://www.dilg.gov.ph 

Living people
1945 births
Mayors of places in Camarines Sur
Evelyn
Women mayors of places in the Philippines